Östhammar Municipality (Östhammars kommun) is a municipality in Uppsala County in east central Sweden. Its seat is located in the city of Östhammar.

The present municipality was created during the local government reform in the late sixties and early seventies. Already in 1967 the City of Öregrund joined the City of Östhammar in a common municipality. It was the first time a former city joined another local government unit. By 1971 the new combined city became a municipality of unitary type and in 1974 more units were added.

In June 2018 the municipal council voted in favour of the building of Forsmark nuclear waste repository, with the final decision needing to be made by the Swedish government.

Localities
All towns with over 200 inhabitants in 2000, from Statistics Sweden.
Östhammar (seat)
Gimo
Österbybruk
Hargshamn
Dannemora
Öregrund
Alunda
Skoby (part of this bimunicipal  locality is in Uppsala Municipality)
Norrskedika

Another notable village is Forsmark (pop. 59), where the Forsmark Nuclear Power Plant is situated.

Climate
Österbybruk has a humid continental climate that is quite mild throughout the year, especially considering its northerly latitude.

References

External links

Östhammar Municipality - Official site

Municipalities of Uppsala County